Đàng Ngoài  (lit. "Outer Land"), also known as Tonkin, Bắc Hà (北河, "North of the River") or  Kingdom of Annam (安南國) by foreigners, was an area in northern Đại Việt (now Vietnam) during the 17th and 18th centuries as the result of Trịnh–Nguyễn War. The word "Đàng Ngoài" first appeared in the Dictionarium Annamiticum Lusitanum et Latinum by Alexandre de Rhodes.

Đàng Ngoài was ruled by the Trịnh lords and the Lê dynasty, whose capital was Thăng Long (now Hanoi). Thăng Long was also known as Đông Kinh 東京, meaning "Eastern Capital", from which the common European name for Đàng Ngoài "Tonkin" originated. It was bordered by Đàng Trong (under the Nguyễn lords) along the Linh River (modern Gianh River in Quảng Bình Province). The name was gradually fading out from the people's memory after Nguyễn Huệ's conquering of the north.

See also
Đàng Trong
Trịnh lords

References

History of Vietnam